Sir William Staines (1731 - 11 September 1807) was a builder and Lord Mayor of London for the year 1800 to 1801.

Staines began life as a bricklayer's labourer  and in time accumulated a vast fortune. He became a Freeman of the Carpenter's Company. In 1783, he became a Common Councillor of Cripplegate ward  of which he was Deputy from 1791 to 1793. He was elected Alderman of  Cripplegate on 10 April 1793, and also became Master of the  Carpenters Company from  1793 to 1794. In spite of being illiterate and  a sort of butt amongst his fellow Aldermen, he was chosen as Sheriff of London for the year 1796 to 1797 and was knighted on  26 October 1796. He was Master of the Carpenters Company again for the year 1798 to 1799 and was Lord Mayor of London for the year 1800 to 1801. 
  
In 1786, Staines built nine houses Jacob's Well Passage for  his aged and indigent friends. He also built Barbican Chapel, and rebuilt the "Jacob's Well" public-house, noted for dramatic representations. An  account of his early life was printed in the European Magazine for November, 1807. A painting of Staines by William Beechey hangs in the Guildhall Art Gallery.

References

1731 births
1807 deaths
19th-century lord mayors of London
19th-century English politicians
18th-century lord mayors of London
18th-century English politicians